Shenley Green is an area of Birmingham. It is located in the south-west of the city, between Weoley Castle and Northfield.

Shenley Green was a post war development built on the location of Shendley Green Farm and by 1958 there were around 8,000 residents.

The centre of Shenley Green comprises a shopping area, the Shenley Centre and St. David's Church. It is part of Bournville Village Trust.

The Shenley Green Centre was conceived by local people and built in 1965 as a youth club. St. David's Church was opened in 1970 and its prominent feature is the large lantern tower. The former church building became the community hall for the new church.

External links
St. David's Church

  
At the Shenley Green Centre there is also a range of useful shops which includes a supermarket, butchers and a chemist which serve the local residents who reside there

Areas of Birmingham, West Midlands